Saudi Arabia is, as with many aspects of daily life, organized according to the principles of Islam, which is the official religion of the country, and which puts emphasis on the importance of knowledge, study, and understanding. The religion believes that obtaining knowledge is the only way to gain true understanding of life, and as such encourage both males and females to study.  The way of practicing Wahhabi Islam has therefore led to segregation in education in Saudi Arabia, and in turn has created segregation in political, economic, and labor force environments. With the current struggle of social norms and laws, women have made great strides to obtain education in Saudi Arabia. However great these strides may be, there are consequences to the economy from not allowing women to have access to equal education, including potential economic struggle.

History
The first school for girls in Saudi Arabia, called the Dar al-Hanan School, opened in 1956, and until then, few girls had an opportunity to get an education of western kind. The first state-run school was opened in 1960/61. The first women college in Saudi Arabia was established by the General Presidency for the Education of Girls in 1970. Until 2002 different departments regulated education for males and females, as women's education was controlled through the Department of Religious Guidance while men's education was overseen by the Ministry of Education. The reason the Department of Religious Guidance retained control of education for women was to ensure that the women were educated in accordance with the principles of Islam as interpreted in Saudi Arabia, which traditionally espoused that women take roles that would be considered gender appropriate such as motherhood, housewifery, teaching, or nursing. According to Natana Delong-Bas, the apparent suppression of women's education by contemporary Wahhabi regimes is due to the adherence to the interpretation of Wahhabi Islam. Mona AlMunajjed explains how within the last 40 years the government has built an educational program that is succeeding in increasing school and university enrollment for women. Improvement in reducing illiteracy rates has also been a success in building the educational infrastructure in Saudi Arabia. Over the years basic education has been offered for children, both male and female, and has been of high quality. Over the history of women's education in Saudi Arabia, women have received basic literacy and numeracy skills, and have completed primary school on time.

Segregation in social life

Norms of education 

Due to the huge advancement thanks to the 2030 VISION started and led by the prince of Saudi Arabia, Mohammed bin Salman, women no longer need their male guardians (such as brothers, fathers and uncles) to permit them to study, accompany them in international travel or to bring them to educational buildings. Women are now allowed to study in mostly every single major possible. Even the top University in Saudi, KVPM, which was previously a men’s only university has begun to accept women in their academy. Scholarships have been open to everyone in Saudi for a while. Saudi also has the largest women’s university in the world, established in 1970 as the first College of Education for women in Saudi Arabia.

Laws 

In Saudi Arabia, officials may ask women for their male guardians' consent. This can happen even when no law or guideline requires such consent. Current practices assume women have no power to make their own decisions. This can have a huge impact on how women can receive education in Saudi Arabia. One example of how women are checked for guardian consent is in many airports, officials ask women of all ages for written proof that their guardian has allowed them to travel. Many women have to receive consent to travel, even for educational reasons. Although the government has taken some steps to limit the power of guardians, there is little evidence showing that officials are backing down from guardian consent.

Enrollment and segregation in education 

The struggle for women's education is an ongoing battle in Saudi Arabia. There is no schooling that allows men and women to be in the same class. Segregation of men and women's education has been part of Saudi Arabia's culture for much of the twentieth century. Abdul Aziz, the founder of the Saudi Kingdom, wanted and showed his support for women's education. However, though Abdul Aziz supported the cause of education for women, educational resources seem to have been dedicated mainly to boys. Women have struggled to obtain equality at every level of education in Saudi Arabia. At the University level, women are allowed to view lectures given by a male professor through a monitor. These women can then choose to ask questions over the telephone. There are, however, higher enrollment rates allowing for gender equality among school students. Statistics show an increase from 272,054 female enrollments in 1974-75 to 2,121,893 in 2004-05. That is a level increase of 33 percent to 48 percent *wrong percentage* in 30 years.

Consequences of educational segregation

Labor market segregation 

Women in Saudi Arabia continue to be marginalized almost to the point of total exclusion from the Saudi workforce. Saudi Arabia has one of the lowest rates of working women in the world.  Women account for only 4% of the total workforce and 10.7% of the labor force. In recent years there has been an issue that has intensified the need for a larger labor force, and allowing women out of the home and into the economy. There has been integration of women in the workforce, but under religious customs, women continue to be secluded from men.  In Saudi Arabia, there are no female judges or prosecutors. The government enforces sex segregation in all workplaces with the exception of hospitals. If the government discovers unlawful mixing of the sexes, they are authorized to arrest the violators and bring them to the nearest police station where they can be criminally charged. The Saudi Labor Code does not include anything requiring sex segregation in the workplace. However, there is little evidence that this has in any way affected the current work environment. The issue of guardianship is introduced and employers in both the private and public sector require female staff to obtain the permission of a male guardian in order to be hired. When women reach working age, employers often do not ask for permission, although the government requires teachers to provide such permission.

Political participation 

Saudi Arabia is governed by sharia law. Sharia law is open to many interpretations, but it does not usually encourage women to hold prominent positions. In 2005 Saudi Arabia held its first nationwide elections. Women, who make up more than 50% of the population, did not participate. They were not permitted to vote or run as candidates in the elections. With the exclusion of political participation, Abdulaziz Al-Heis contends that women will not be able to participate and find a platform to have their voice heard for equality and other demands. There needs to be a push forward and renewal of institutions for religious ideas so the political economy can include both men and women.
Since 2015, women are allowed to vote and present themselves as candidates for the country's municipal elections.

Death 

 
In Mecca in 2002, a group of female school girls died in a big fire in their school. The religious police officers would not allow the rescue workers to enter the school. 
 
Many years later, a female student at King Saud University died after the religious police officers stopped paramedics from entering.

List of universities that enroll women 

There are currently 36 universities in Saudi Arabia that allow women to enroll, with a number of them being for women only.

King Saud University

 King Abdulaziz University
 
King Faisal University
 
Umm Al-Qura University
 
King Abdullah University of Science and Technology
 
Imam Muhammad Ibn Saud Islamic University
 
 Institute of Public Administration
 
Taibah University
 
King Khalid University
 
Alfaisal University

Qassim University
 
Najran University
 
Jazan University
 
Majmaah University
 
Taif University
 
Princess Nora bint Abdulrahman University (women only)
 
 University of Ha'il 	
 
King Saud bin Abdulaziz University for Health Sciences
 
Prince Sultan University
 
 Salman bin Abdulaziz University 	
 
University of Dammam

Prince Mohammad Bin Fahd University

Al Jouf University

University of Tabuk

 Shaqra University 	
 
 Baha University 	
 
Effat University (women only)
 
Northern Borders University
 
 University of Business and Technology 	
 
Dar Al Uloom University
 
Al Yamamah University
 
Fahd bin Sultan University
 
Dar Al-Hekma University (women only)

 Riyadh College of Dentistry and Pharmacy 	
 
 Batterjee medical college

References

Education in Saudi Arabia
Saudi Arabia
Women in Saudi Arabia
Women's rights in Saudi Arabia